Sharjah American International School (SAIS) is a K–12 private international school in Sharjah, Emirate of Sharjah, United Arab Emirates.

See also 
 Americans in the United Arab Emirates
 Education in the United Arab Emirates

References

External links 
 

International schools in Sharjah (city)
American international schools in the United Arab Emirates
Educational institutions established in 1997
1997 establishments in the United Arab Emirates